Jahid (Arabic: جاهِد jāhid) is an Arabic name from the word which means "effort, strive" or "endeavour" and stems from the Arabic verb jahada (Arabic: َجَهَد) "to do effort to get something  be laborious; be perseverant; be sedulous; be serious". Notable people with this name include:

 Jahid Ali, Pakistani cricketer
 Jahid Ahmed, English cricketer
 Jahid Jahim, Malaysian politician
 Jahid Javed, Bangladeshi cricketer
 Jahid Mohseni, Tajik businessman
 Jahid Nirob, Bangladeshi singer and composer
 Raid Jahid Fahmi, Iraqi politician and economist

See also 

 Jaahid Ali

Arabic-language surnames
Arabic masculine given names